Somebody Else may refer to:
"Somebody Else" (Mario song), 2013
"Somebody Else" (The 1975 song), 2016
"Somebody Else", a 1997 song by Hurricane G
Somebody Else, a 2003 novel by Reggie Nadelson

See also
 "You're Somebody Else", a 2017 song by Flora Cash
 Someone Else (disambiguation)